Barnea candida is a marine bivalve mollusc in the family Pholadidae.

Description
The shell is long and covered in horizontal ribs, crossed by vertical ribs, forming a structure. On the intersections are scale formed spikes. A narrow and curved edge is located on the inside of the shell.
<div align=center>

</div align=center>

Size
 Length: up to 50 mm
 Width: up to 20 mm.

Colour
Chalk-white, yellow-white or grey.

Fossil
Barnea candida is common in the North Sea region in deposits from the Holocene, the Eemian Stage and late Middle Pleistocene.

References
  , 1991. Schelpen van de Nederlandse kust. Jeugdbondsuitgeverij Stichting Uitgevrij KNNV, 165 pag.
  , 2004. Veldgids Schelpen. KNNV Uitgeverij, 234 pag.
  , 1994. Nederlandse naamlijst van de weekdieren (Mollusca) van Nederland en België. Feestuitgave ter gelegenheid van het zestigjarig jubileum van de Nederlandse Malacologische Vereniging. Backhuys, Leiden. 149 pp. 
  , 1984. De fossiele schelpen van de Nederlandse stranden en zeegaten, tweede serie, 8 (slot). Basteria, 48: 89-220.

External links
 Animal Diversity Web: Barnea
 MarBEF Data System: Barnea candida
 MARLIN: Barnea candida

Pholadidae
Bivalves described in 1758
Taxa named by Carl Linnaeus